Enter the Eagles (also known in the United States as And Now You're Dead) is a 1998 Hong Kong action thriller film directed by Corey Yuen, and starring Michael Wong, Anita Yuen, Jordan Chan, Shannon Lee, Benny Urquidez and Jordan Andrew Perry.

Like Shannon Lee's late brother Brandon Lee's film Legacy of Rage (1986), this was Shannon Lee's first and only film produced in Hong Kong and co-stars Michael Wong, who played Michael Wan in Legacy of Rage.

Plot
Professional thief Martin is assigned to steal the largest diamond in the Czech Republic, the Czar's Prism for $3M. Needing extra help, Martin brings in his former partner Mandy, an excellent sharpshooter with lethal martial arts skills. Together with two young pickpockets, the group sets out in an adventure of espionage, double crossing, and explosive action.

Cast and characters
 Shannon Lee as Mandy
 Michael Wong as Marty
 Jordan Chan as Tommy Mak
 Anita Yuen as Lucy
 Benny Urquidez as Karloff
 Jordan Andrew Perry as Ben
 Mike Lambert as Mob Fighter
 Ricardo Alexander as Mob Fighter
 Jamie Wilson as Mob Fighter
 Mike Abbott
 Mike Miller as Bodyguard
 Noel Lester Rands as Wussin
 Steve Brettingham as Wussin's Bodyguard
 Jude Poyer as Wussin's Bodyguard
 Petr Meissel as Policeman
 Petr Koutecky as Policeman
 Petr Prosek as Policeman
 Josef Trnka as Policeman

Home media release
On 23 April 2001, DVD was released by Mia at the United Kingdom in Region 2.

External links
 
 

1998 films
1998 action thriller films
1998 martial arts films
1990s heist films
1990s Cantonese-language films
Kung fu films
Jeet Kune Do films
Films directed by Corey Yuen
Hong Kong action thriller films
Hong Kong martial arts films
Gun fu films
Hong Kong heist films
Golden Harvest films
1990s Hong Kong films